Owen John Jenkins  (born 21 August 1969) is a British diplomat who is currently the British Ambassador to Indonesia and East Timor.

Career 
Jenkins is the son of Sir Christopher Jenkins and was educated at Highgate School and the University of Sheffield where he gained first class honours in English Literature.

He joined the Foreign Office in 1991 and has served in Ankara from 1994–97, Buenos Aires 2002-06, Brussels 2006-09 and New Delhi 2009-12. After his appointment as UK Special Representative for Afghanistan and Pakistan from 2015-17 he was seconded in 2018 to Aberdeen Standard Life.

Jenkins, who is married with two sons and a daughter, has promoted Women's rights in Indonesia.

In April 2020, Jenkins urged Climate Action during the COVID-19 pandemic in Indonesia.

As ambassador, he paid his condolences after the disappearance of KRI Nanggala (402).

Jenkins was appointed Companion of the Order of St Michael and St George (CMG) in the 2021 Birthday Honours.

References

External links 

 Owen Jenkins at the Government of the United Kingdom

Living people
21st-century British diplomats
Ambassadors of the United Kingdom to Indonesia
Ambassadors of the United Kingdom to East Timor
Civil servants from London
1969 births
People educated at Highgate School
Alumni of the University of Sheffield